Mordechai Zeira (1905–1968), born in Kiev as Dimitry Greben, was an Israeli composer.

Songs

Layla, Layla
Shnei Shoshanim ('Two Roses')
What Say Your Eyes?

References

1905 births
1968 deaths
Israeli composers
Soviet emigrants to Israel
20th-century composers
Male composers
Musicians from Kyiv
20th-century male musicians
Burials at Kiryat Shaul Cemetery